Rapid growing mycobacterium consists of organism of the Mycobacterium fortuitum group and Mycobacterium chelonae/Mycobacterium abscessus group and these usually cause subcutaneous abscesses or cellulitis following trauma in immunocompetent patients.

List of rapidly growing Mycobacteria
 Mycobacterium fortuitum
 Mycobacterium chelonae
 Mycobacterium smegmatis
 Mycobacterium abscessus
 Mycobacterium mucogenicum
 Mycobacterium peregrinum

Nonchromogenic
 Mycobacterium abscessus
 Mycobacterium agri
 Mycobacterium alvei
 Mycobacterium arupense
 Mycobacterium fortuitum

Chromogenic 
Scotochromogenic

Yellow-Orange

•Mycobacterium aichiense

Photochromogenic

•Mycobacterium novocastrense (sp.nova)

See also 
 Skin lesion

References 

Acid-fast bacilli